Star Wars: Purge is a comic book one-shot released on December 28, 2005 by Dark Horse Comics.  The story was written by John Ostrander, and the art was done by Doug Wheatley. The events depicted take place in the Star Wars galaxy approximately one month after the events in Revenge of the Sith.

Synopsis
The story starts in Eriadu, a planet in the Outer Rim. There, clone troopers are searching for Jedi Master Tsui Choi. After Choi surprises them and defeats them, he is surprised by another Jedi survivor, Bultar Swan. The two head off under Bultar's guidance.

Meanwhile, on Coruscant, Darth Vader completes his torture of Jedi Dama Montalvo by killing him, his reason being that Dama refused to give up the location of Obi-Wan Kenobi. Afterwards, a clone trooper informs Lord Vader that Imperial spies have information of a Jedi gathering on Kessel.

The person who has called this gathering is Shadday Potkin. Bultar and Tsui arrive, bringing the total amount of Jedi in attendance to eight. The Jedi began to debate what should be done about the Empire and the purge of their order, and Koffi Arana proposes going to the dark side of the Force to stop Vader. As the Jedi ponder this, a dark presence is sensed arriving. It is none other than Lord Vader. Secretly, Shadday has "invited", by spreading rumors Obi-Wan would be here, in hopes of the Jedi group being able to trap and overwhelm him. To help her do this, she also employs the use of a cortosis-weaved blade.

Vader quickly dispatches one of the Jedi, Sia-Lan Wezz, and while fighting the other Jedi, promptly disposes of another, Ma'kis'shaalas. Shadday is able to corner Vader and dispose of his lightsaber blade with the cortosis weapon, but then Vader uses the Force to grab Shadday and steal her weapon, then snaps her neck. Using the cortosis blade, Vader disables the lightsabers of Roblio Darté, Jastus Farr, and Arana. Tsui Choi manages to sever Vader's right hand and so Vader claims to "surrender".

Arana does not believe that Vader is sincere. Bultar points out that Jedi do not take the lives of unarmed opponents. Arana strikes Bultar down with her own lightsaber, and lunges at Vader with Swan's weapon. Vader, via the Force, sends the cortosis blade still gripped in his severed, robotic hand through Arana's chest and grabs Swan's lightsaber. The three remaining Jedi use the Force to hurl debris at Vader. Tsui Choi prepares to finish off a now almost incapacitated Vader, when a contingent of 501st Clone troopers, led by Commander Bow, arrive via an over-head cat-walk and open fire. Jastus Farr slumps to his death, while Choi Force-jumps up to the 501 troopers hoping to distracts them so as chance for Darté to escape, Vader uses Force Grip to hold Tsui Choi in mid-air while the clone troopers shoot both of the remaining Jedi. Tsui Choi dies from the shots, but not before striking Vader's helmet with a lightsaber throw.

Vader returns to Coruscant, where his narrow-escape over the eight Jedi has blossomed into a politically leveragable rumor that states Vader tracked down a nest of fifty Jedi and destroyed them all.

Sequels 
Another one-shot, titled Purge: Seconds to Die, was released by Dark Horse on November 11, 2009; it was written by John Ostrander, with art by Jim Hall and Alex Lei. Additionally, Purge: The Hidden Blade was released on April 7, 2010; it was written by W. Haden Blackman with art by Chris Scalf. Purge: The Tyrant's Fist was a two-part series released in December 2012 and January 2013; it was written by Alexander Freed with art by Marco Castiello and  Andrea Chella. The entire five-part series was collected in a trade paperback in July 2013 and in the Star Wars Legends Marvel Epic Collection The Empire, released in April 2015.

References

External links
Dark Horse Comics Listing
Official CargoBay Listing

2005 comics debuts
Dark Horse Comics titles
One-shot comic titles
Comics based on Star Wars